AIDAaura is the third cruise ship operated by the German cruise line AIDA Cruises. AIDAaura was built in 2003 by the German shipyard Aker MTW in Wismar.

Description

The cruise ship has capacity for 1,266 passengers. The vessel is equipped with several amenities for the passengers including bars, lounges, a library and a two-storey theater. AIDAaura has a crew of 389. The markings of the vessel include red lips and blue eyes painted on the bow of Aida, the Ethiopian princess from the Giuseppe Verdi opera of 1871. The vessel has a swept-back funnel and a wedge-shaped stern.

Construction and career
The cruise ship was laid down on 11 January 2002 at the Aker MTW shipyard in Wismar, Germany with the yard number 004. The vessel was launched on 14 September 2002 and completed on 3 April 2003.  The vessel cost $350 million. The vessel was christened AIDAaura on 12 April 2003 at Warnemünde. The vessel made its maiden voyage in April 2003. In 2003, the vessel was built for P&O Cruises, a subsidiary of Carnival Corporation & plc, which took over ownership of the vessel and registered the cruise ship in London, United Kingdom. In 2004, AIDAaura was acquired by Costa Crociere and the registry moved to Genoa, Italy and the operator changed to AIDA Cruises, a subsidiary of the Carnival Corporation.

On 8 October 2018, AIDAaura departed from Hamburg on a 117-day round-the-world cruise. The ship visited 41 ports in 20 countries on four continents. AIDAaura, with about 1,200 people on board, was held on 3 March 2020 in the harbor of Haugesund, Norway, while two asymptomatic German passengers were tested who had been in contact with a person who subsequently developed COVID-19; their test results were negative.

In January 2023 AIDA Cruises announced the decommissioning of the ship in autumn 2023.

Citations

Sources

External links

 Official AIDAaura website 
 

Ships built in Wismar
Ships of AIDA Cruises
2002 ships